The First Nations Summit  is a First Nations political organization in British Columbia founded in 1992 after the formation of the British Columbia Treaty Commission and the British Columbia Treaty Process. It represents the interests of First Nation band governments involved in the treaty process. These constitute 111 of the 194 of the bands in British Columbia but represent over 60% of the First Nations population.

See also
British Columbia Treaty Process

References

External links 
Official Site

First Nations organizations in British Columbia
First Nations Summit Task Group members